Tahaan – A Boy With a Grenade is an Indian Hindi-language drama film by Santosh Sivan. The film is based on the life of a young boy and his pet donkey. It is a fable-like journey of the eponymous eight-year-old boy, whose life revolves around the pursuit to find real purpose in his little world. The film stars Purav Bhandare as the young boy. Anupam Kher, Sarika, Rahul Bose, Rahul Khanna and Victor Banerjee form the rest of the cast. It was filmed on location in Jammu and Kashmir.

Plot 

After salvaging money using various means, Tahaan reaches the moneylender to reclaim Birbal. He is told that old Subhan Dar (Anupam Kher) bought the donkey and went across the mountains in which Tahaan's father went missing. Gathering courage, Tahaan goes in search of the old man. He finds him and he follows Subhan and his assistant Zafar (Rahul Bose) and their mule train, leading Birbal despite their protests. Although Subhan promises to return Birbal to Tahaan if he can win a race against the incompetent Zafar when he wins Subhan refuses to give him Birbal. Instead, Subhan gives the donkey to his eight-year-old nephew. Zafar tries to give Tahaan his sunglasses as a replacement for the donkey, but Tahaan will not accept the gift.

On his way back home, Tahaan encounters Idrees, a teenager who discourages him, saying that his efforts will not be sufficient to get Birbal back. Instead, he suggests to do him a favour. Tahaan is asked to take a package across the mountains in his onward journey. Upon seeing his eagerness, Idrees hands him over a grenade and says that when the time is right, he will be told what needs to be done. At a checkpoint, the package and grenade are not discovered due to the fact that the soldiers know and trust Subhan Darr. Tahaan is about to commit a terrorist act with the grenade and has already removed the pin when he changes his mind and throws it safely in a river. He then sees his father emerge from the building he almost blew up.
Subhan's nephew learns that Tahaan is fond of Birbal, and at his request, Subhan gives the donkey back to Tahaan.

Cast
Purav Bhandare as Tahaan
Anupam Kher as Subhan
Rahul Bose as Zafar
Sarika as Haba, Tahaan's mother
Victor Banerjee as, Tahaan's Grandfather
Fatima Sana Shaikh as Zoya, Tahaan's elder sister
Rahul Khanna as Kuku Saab
Rasika Dugal as Nadira
Ankush Dubey as Idrees
Dheirya Sonech as Yasin
Tavasvat singh as Babina

Production 
After major commercial releases such as The Terrorist (1999), Asoka (2001), Anandabhadram (2005) and Before the Rains (2007), award-winning director Santosh Sivan got the idea for this film after reading a newspaper report. He formed a fable-like story from the report.

Since Kashmir is a strife-torn area, films are rarely picturised there. However, in the case of this film, Sivan thought that audiences can relate it to the film well. It was only after 18 years that a film was filmed in Kashmir.

While filming in Pahalgam, Sivan realised to his surprise that children were comfortable with guns. It seemed to him that it was a part of everyday life for them. The film makes eloquent use of Quranic verses or azaan, for which the director took help from research scholars in Kashmir.

When shooting there we only wanted to show the real life. I had heard some Quranic verses there at some Dargah. I thought I could use them to send a message of hope. I wanted to use the azaan for a nice purpose, a beautiful thing, not for any wrong deed... At the end I wanted to show the positive power of a dream.

Soundtrack

Critical reception
The film opened to generally positive reviews. Ziya Us Salam of The Hindu hailed the film as a 'visual poem' and "Responsible cinema, brilliant cinema." Raja Sen of Rediff gave it 4 out of 5 stars, calling it a "must-watch". Rajiv Masand of CNN-IBN called it a "film of great virtue" and gave 3 out of 5 stars. Baradwaj Rangan called it a "film of first-rate performances".

Awards
Tahaan won a High Commendation in Children's Feature Film section at the 2009 Asia Pacific Screen Awards.
Tahaan Won Best feature film award, CIFEJ Award (Centre International du Film pour l' Enfant et la Jeunesse)and UNICEF Award at 11th Olympia International Film Festival for Children and Young People in 2008 held at Greece
Tahaan won "The German Star of India award" at "Bollywood and Beyond" festival at Stuttgart Germany in 2009

Festivals
The film has gone to the following festivals:

2008
Pusan
Rome
Cinekid
London Film Festival
Olympia Film Festival in Greece. (Winner of 3 awards at the festival)
Amazonas in Brazil

2009
Palm Springs Festival in the USA.
Hong Kong International Film Festival
Stockholm International Film Festival
New York International Children's Film Festival
Fribourg International Film Festival in Switzerland
Cairo International Film Festival
Seattle International Film Festival
Titanic International Film Festival (Hungary)
Movies that Matter (Amsterdam) Showcase sponsored by the Amnesty International.
Munich Film Festival
Stuttgart Festival

Distribution 

Tahaan was picked up for US distribution by GKIDS. The film will play as the Centerpiece Selection of the MIAAC Indian Film Festival, as well as the Starz Denver Film Festival, the St Louis Film Festival, the Three Rivers Film Festival, and the New York/San Francisco International Children's Film Festival.

References

External links 
 
 

2008 films
2000s Hindi-language films
Films set in Jammu and Kashmir
Kashmir conflict in films
Films directed by Santosh Sivan
Films about donkeys